Ivan Vasilyonok (born 17 May 1989) is a Belarusian professional footballer. As of 2020, he is playing for Krumkachy Minsk.

References

External links

Profile at teams.by
Profile at kick-off.by

1989 births
Living people
Belarusian footballers
Association football defenders
FC Gorodeya players
FC Klechesk Kletsk players
FC Smolevichi players
FC Slavia Mozyr players
FC Neman Stolbtsy players
FC Krumkachy Minsk players